Weed Lake is a wetland near Langdon, Alberta, Canada. It is the home to many natural wildlife including several species of birds and fish.

It is a  wetland that is regionally important as waterfowl habitat. In 1971, the original lake was drained for agriculture but since 2006, the lake has been restored and it is now a fully functioning, healthy wetland ecosystem. Organizations involved in acquiring the land and restoring the lake were led by Ducks Unlimited and include the Calgary Field Naturalists' Society.

List of species
In 2015 students of Sarah Thompson School, assisted by local wildlife experts, identified the following list of species at Weed Lake:

Amphibians
Boreal chorus frog

Birds
(It has been reported elsewhere that 172 species of bird have been observed at Weed Lake.)

Black-necked stilt 
Black tern 
Northern shoveler 
American white pelican 
Blue jay 
Canada goose 
Great blue heron 
Trumpeter swan 
Mallard duck

Mammals

Coyote  
Muskrat

Insects

Butterflies 
Diving beetles  
Dragonflies 
Ladybugs 
Grass spiders (Agelenopsis)

Plants

Algae 
Cattail 
Bulrush 
Sage 
Duckweed 
Early blue violet 
Dandelion (Taraxacum officinale) 
Bladderwort

References

Wetlands of Canada
Landforms of Alberta